O'Dwyer or O'Dwyers may refer to:

House of (Clan) O'Dwyer

People
 O'Dwyer (surname)
 O'Dwyers of Kilnamanagh
 William O'Dwyer, 100th mayor of New York City (1946-1950)

Other
 J. R. O'Dwyer Company, magazine publisher for the United States public relations industry
 O'Dwyers GAA, a Gaelic Athletic Association club based at Hamlet Lane, Balbriggan, County Dublin, Ireland
 O'Dwyer VLe, handgun – see List of caseless firearms

See also
 Dwyer (disambiguation)
 Dwyre